Serbia competed at the 2022 World Games held in Birmingham, United States from 7 to 17 July 2022. Athletes representing Serbia won two gold medals, two silver medals and one bronze medal. The country finished in 26th place in the medal table.

Medalists

Competitors
The following is the list of number of competitors in the Games.

Boules sports 

Serbia won one bronze medal in boules sports.

Ju-jitsu

Serbia won two medals in ju-jitsu.

Kickboxing

Serbia won two medals in kickboxing.

References

Nations at the 2022 World Games
2022
World Games